Suite PreCure is the eighth Pretty Cure anime television series produced by Toei Animation. It follows Hibiki Hojo and Kanade Minamino who become Cure Melody and Cure Rhythm in order to stop the evil Mephisto who plans to cover the world in the Melody of Sorrow. The series began airing in Japan from February 6, 2011 to January 29, 2012, replacing HeartCatch PreCure! in its initial timeslot and was succeeded by Smile PreCure!.


Episode list

See also

Suite PreCure the Movie: Take it back! The Miraculous Melody that Connects Hearts - An animated film based on the series.
Pretty Cure All Stars DX3: Deliver the Future! The Rainbow-Colored Flower That Connects the World – The third Pretty Cure All Stars crossover film which stars the Suite Pretty Cures.

References
General
 http://asahi.co.jp/precure/
 http://www.toei-anim.co.jp/tv/precure/

Specific

2011 Japanese television seasons
Pretty Cure episode lists

es:Anexo:Episodios de Futari wa Pretty Cure